LGBT-related films released in the 2020s are listed in the following articles:
 List of LGBT-related films of 2020
 List of LGBT-related films of 2021
 List of LGBT-related films of 2022
 List of LGBT-related films of 2023

 
2020s